The 1916–17 Maltese First Division was the sixth edition Maltese First Division and was won by St. George's in a final match decider against Sliema Wanderers, won 4–0 by the Cospicua-based club.

League table

Championship tie-breaker
With both St. George's and Sliema Wanderers level on 12 points, a play-off match was conducted to decide the champion.

Results

See also 
 1916 in association football
 1917 in association football

1916-17
1916–17 in European association football leagues
1916 in Malta
1917 in Malta